Juan Manuel Cano Ceres (born 12 December 1987 in San Miguel de Tucumán) is an Argentine racewalker. He was raised in La Banda, Santiago del Estero.  He competed in the 20 km walk at the 2008, 2012 and 2016 Summer Olympics. At the 2012 Olympics, he placed 22nd with a time of 1:22:10, an Argentine national record.

He has also represented Argentina at the 2009, 2011, 2013 and 2015 World Athletics Championships.

Personal bests

Competition record

References

External links
 
 
 
 
 

1987 births
Living people
Argentine male racewalkers
Olympic athletes of Argentina
Athletes (track and field) at the 2008 Summer Olympics
Athletes (track and field) at the 2012 Summer Olympics
Athletes (track and field) at the 2016 Summer Olympics
World Athletics Championships athletes for Argentina
Pan American Games competitors for Argentina
Athletes (track and field) at the 2019 Pan American Games
Sportspeople from San Miguel de Tucumán